Biodegradable additives are additives that enhance the biodegradation of polymers by allowing microorganisms to utilize the carbon within the polymer chain as a source of energy. Biodegradable additives attract microorganisms to the polymer through quorum sensing after biofilm creation on the plastic product. Additives are generally in masterbatch formation that use carrier resins such as polyethylene (PE), polypropylene (PP), polystyrene (PS) or polyethylene terephthalate (PET).

Most common synthetic plastics are not biodegradable, and both chemical and physical properties of plastics play important roles in the process of plastic degradation. The addition of biodegradable additives can influence the mechanism of plastic degradation by changing the chemical and physical properties of plastics to increase the rate of degradation. Biodegradable additives can convert the plastic degradation process to one of biodegradation. Instead of being degraded simply by environmental factors, such as sunlight (photo-oxidation) or heat (thermal degradation), biodegradable additives allow polymers to be degraded by microorganisms and bacteria through direct or indirect attack.  

While some plastic additives merely affect the surface of plastics (ex. colorants), effective biodegradable additives must change the interior of the plastics and their chemical properties, as well. Good biodegradable additives expedite the rate of degradation by reducing the strength of certain properties of the polymers and increasing their attractiveness to microorganisms.

Mechanism of biodegradation 

In general, the process of microbial plastic biodegradation results in a considerable decrease in polymer molecular weight, causing the plastic to lose its structural integrity. There are several different ways in which microorganisms can carry out the process of plastic degradation, and the mechanism differs slightly depending on the environmental conditions.

Direct Action 
Some microorganisms can directly consume plastic fragments and use the carbon as a nutritional source. For example, Brevibacillus borstelensis, Rhodococcus rubber, Pseudomonas chlororaphis, and Comamonas acidovorans TB-35 have all been shown experimentally to use direct action to consume polyethylene. For other less commonly used plastics, researchers have only found one strain of microbe capable of directly degrading a specific plastic. More research is currently being done to discover other microbial strains that can effectively biodegrade plastics.

Polymer molecular weight plays a significant role in whether microorganisms can use direction action to break down plastics because it is quite difficult for microorganisms to directly degrade high molecular weight polymers. Functional groups on the polymer also determine whether a polymer will be directly degraded, with large substituents being more difficult to degrade.

Indirect Action 
Microbes involved in the breakdown of fossil-based plastics typically use an indirect mechanism in which microbial enzymes break down the plastic. Through indirect action, the metabolic products of the microorganism affect the properties of the plastic, resulting in degradation.

Enzyme-based microbial biodegradation can occur under two conditions: aerobic and anaerobic. Plastics are typically made up of hydrophobic polymers, so the first step of biodegradation under both conditions involves the breakdown of the polymer by the enzyme into smaller constituents such as oligomers, dimers, and monomers. The breaking down the plastic into smaller molecules is known as hydrolysis or oxidation, and this process increases the hydrophilicity of the polymer. Hydrolysis or oxidation is the most important step in the mechanism since it initiates the entire process of plastic biodegradation. Once hydrolysis or oxidation occurs, the microorganisms can act directly on the lower molecular weight products and utilize the carbon in these fragments as a source of energy.

Common enzymes involved in microbial plastic biodegradation include lipase, proteinase K, pronase, and hydrogenase, among others. The efficacy of these enzymes depends on the type of plastic being degraded. Furthermore, the products of microbial biodegradation will differ depending on the environmental conditions.

Aerobic 
Under aerobic conditions, the microorganisms will use oxygen as an electron acceptor. The resulting products are carbon dioxide (CO2) and water (H2O). Examples of aerobic conditions for microbial biodegradation include landfills and sediments.

Anaerobic 
Under anaerobic conditions, the lack of oxygen requires that the bacteria use a different source for an electron acceptor. Common electron acceptors used by anaerobic bacteria are sulfate, iron, nitrate, manganese and carbon dioxide. The resulting products under anaerobic conditions are carbon dioxide (CO2), water (H2O), and methane (CH4).

A simple chemical equation of the anaerobic process is:

C6H12O6 → 3CO2 + 3CH4

Examples of anaerobic conditions for microbial biodegradation include soil and composts.

Types of biodegradable additives

Starch 
Starch is a common biodegradable additive, and blends of synthetic plastics with starch are becoming more and more prevalent. Because starch is a polymeric carbohydrate, it can be directly consumed by microorganisms. Starch is a renewable and cheap resource that is available all year round, making it a viable biodegradable additive.

While starch is a promising biodegradable additive, it is currently only being blended with certain synthetic plastics. Starch and polyvinyl alcohol (PVA) blends are completely biodegraded by various microbes because both components are biodegradable. However, the addition of starch may increase the rate of degradation of PVA. Starch and polyester blends have also been found to be completely biodegradable. The presence of a continuous starch phase allows direct consumption of the plastic by microorganisms because the material becomes more hydrophilic. Microorganisms can directly attack and remove the starch from the plastic, leading to its degradation. Starch is most commonly used as a biodegradable additive for both low-density polyethylene (LDPE) and high-density polyethylene (HDPE). Since polyethylene is used for a wide range of uses, from plastic bags to plastic water bottles to outdoor furniture, large amounts of PE plastic is thrown away each year, and determining ways to increase its biodegradability has become an important area of research.

Cornplast, produced by the National Corn Grower Association (USA), is a specific starch additive that can be used to increase the biodegradability of synthetic polyethylene. Cornplast is a material whose composition is 20% polyethylene and 80% starch. 50%-50% by weight blends of Cornplast with both LDPE and HDPE have been studied to determine the effectiveness of starch as a biodegradable additive.

Bioaugmentation 
The addition of certain microbial strains to plastics is known as bioaugmentation, and it is a method to increase the biodegradability of plastics. Bioaugmentation has been used to enhance the rate of degradability of already compostable plastics, such as poly(lactic acid) (PLA). Composting plastics is a promising alternative to disposing of plastics in landfills. However, a plastic requires certain properties to be compostable. To increase the compostability and biodegradability of plastics, bioaugmentation is a method of directly adding microorganisms to the plastic. In this case, the biodegradable additives are the microbes themselves.

Experiments must be done to determine which specific microbial strains present in the compost are able to actually bind to the plastics to determine potential sources for bioaugmentation. These experiments must be done for various plastics, as the differences in the properties of the plastics will affect the binding ability of the microbial strain. To determine whether the strain of microorganism is degrading the plastic, measurements of the amount of carbon dioxide present is typically used since carbon dioxide is a product of both aerobic and anaerobic microbial degradation. To confirm that the microorganisms being studied are attracted to a certain type of plastic, it is important that the synthetic plastic is the only source of carbon in the experimental compost or soil. If there is a significant release of carbon dioxide, it means that the microorganism has successfully consumed the carbon in the plastic.

One example of a strain of microbes that has been used for the successful bioaugmentation of poly(lactic acid) is Geobacillus thermoleovorans. This strain of bacteria can grow in both marine and terrestrial conditions and is able to use a variety of sugars, hydrocarbons, and carboxylic acids as nutritional sources. Geobacillus thermoleovorans successfully attaches to the surface of poly(lactic acid), and experiments show that this colonization will increase the rate of microbial degradation of the plastic.

Pro-oxidant additives 
Pro-oxidant additives increase the rate of both thermo-oxidation and photo-oxidation, resulting in a larger amount of low molecular extractable compounds. Microbial strains can then efficiently attack the carbon in these low molecular weight fragments of the large chain polymers.

Pro-oxidant additives are commonly used to enhance the rate of biodegradation of polyethylene and polyethylene films. Polyethylene is a very common polymer used in many everyday plastic products, such as water bottles, grocery bags, and drain pipes. However, its high molecular weight hinders the ability for microorganisms to naturally degrade the material. Pro-oxidant additives have been effective in increasing the biodegradability of polyethylene by creating smaller fragments of the polymer.

Typical pro-oxidant additives are the transition metal complexes or transient metal ions, which are added to the plastic in the form of stearate or other organic ligand complexes. The most common metals used as pro-oxidants are iron (Fe), manganese (Mn), and cobalt (Co). Fe complexes increase the rate of photooxidation by providing a source of radicals for the initiation step in the process of creating smaller molecular weight fragments. The use of such OXO-biodegradation additives was banned in the EU in 2019 due to concerns that treated plastics do not fully biodegrade and instead result in the accelerated formation of microplastics.

Current research on the biodegradation of polyethylene has shown that biodegradation is initially quite fast when pro-oxidant additives are included in the plastic, most likely due to the rapid consumption of the low molecular weight plastic fragments by microorganisms.

Testing of biodegradable additives

Testing methods 
Several tests can be performed on a certain plastic in order to determine whether a potential additive increases its biodegradability.  

Comparison of the changes in physical properties of the plastic both with and without potential biodegradable additives throughout the degradation process can provide insight into the efficacy of the additive. If the degradation is significantly affected with the addition of the additive, it could indicate that biodegradation is improved. Some important physical properties that can be measured experimentally are tensile strength, molecular weight, elasticity, and crystallinity. Measuring the physical appearance of the plastic before and after potential microbial biodegradation can also provide insight into the efficacy of the degradation. 

Thermal analysis is a useful method for characterizing the effects of degradation on the physical properties of polymers. Information about the thermal stability and the kinetic parameters of thermal decomposition can be obtained through thermogravimetric analysis. These kinetic parameters provide information about the breakdown of molecular chains, an indicator of degradation. From measurements of enthalpies in the melt state and the crystalline state, the evolution of the crystallinity content of plastics can be recorded. Changes to crystallinity can indicate that degradation was either successful or unsuccessful. Lamellar thickness distribution of the plastic can also be measured using thermal analyses.

Another way to determine the efficacy of biodegradation is by measuring the amount of carbon dioxide and/or methane produced by the microorganisms that are degrading the plastic. Since carbon dioxide and methane are products of the microbial degradation process, large amounts of these products in the air indicate that the synthetic plastic has been consumed and converted into energy.

Testing environmental conditions

Thermo-oxidative Treatments 
Thermo-oxidative treatments of synthetic plastics can replicate the conditions under which a plastic will be used (ex. storing water for a water bottle). These tests can be used to observe changes in the plastic during its service life in a much shorter period of time that would be necessary to naturally observe the plastic. Typical air atmosphere conditions are controlled using specific instrumentation (ex. Heraeus UT 6060 oven).

Soil Burial 
Accelerated soil burial tests are used to record the degradation process of the plastic in the ground by replicating the conditions of a landfill, a typical disposal site for plastics. These tests are used after the service life of the material has been depleted, and the next step for the material is disposal. Typically, samples are buried in biologically active soil for six months and are exposed to air to ensure that there is sufficient oxygen so that the aerobic mechanism of degradation can occur. The experimental conditions must reflect natural conditions closely, so the moisture and temperature of the soil are carefully controlled. The type of soil used must also be recorded, as it can affect the degradation process.

Specific Testing Methods 
The following testing methods have been approved by the American Society for Testing and Materials: 

 ASTM D5511-12 testing is for the "Anerobic Biodegradation of Plastic Materials in a High Solids Environment Under High-Solids Anaerobic-Digestion Conditions"
 ASTM D5526-12 testing is for the "Standard Test Method for Determining Anaerobic Biodegradation of Plastic Materials Under Accelerated Landfill Conditions"
 ASTM D5210-07 testing is for the "Standard Test Method for Determining the Anaerobic Biodegradation of Plastic Materials in the Presence of Municipal Sewage Sludge"

Laboratories performing ASTM testing methods

 Eden Research Labs
 Respirtek
 NE Laboratories
 NSF

Environmental Impact 

Biodegradable additives have the potential to significantly reduce the accumulation of plastics in the environment. Plastics are ubiquitous in everyday life and are produced and disposed of in huge quantities each year. Many common plastics, such as polyethylene, polypropylene, polystyrene, poly(vinyl chloride), and poly(ethylene terephthalate), that can be found in most consumer products are not biodegradable. Furthermore, only about 9-10% of discarded plastics are recycled each year. Non-biodegradable plastics accumulate in the environment, threatening human, animal, and environmental health.

Current solutions to dealing with the amount of plastic being thrown away include burning the plastics and dumping them into large fields or landfills. Burning plastics leads to significant amounts of air pollution, which is harmful to human and animal health. When dumped into fields or landfills, plastics can cause changes in the pH of the soil, leading to soil infertility. Furthermore, plastic bottles and plastic bags that end up in landfills are frequently consumed by animals, which then clogs their digestive systems and leads to death.

Because of the substantial growth in plastic consumption, biodegradable additives are becomingly increasingly necessary to increase the rate of degradability of common plastics. Current research is focused on finding new biodegradable additives that will shorten the degradation process from taking decades to centuries to taking only a few months to a few years.

Biodegradable additive manufacturers
 Breakdown Plastic Inc.
 Bio-Tec Environmental, LLC
 EcoSafe Plastic
 Hybrid Green
 Biosphere Plastic, LLC
 EcoLogic, LLC
 ECM BioFilms, Inc.
 Ecobyc

References

Plastics additives